A variety of aboriginal Tasmanian attested in a manuscript nicknamed the "Norman" vocabulary is identified as a distinct language in the reconstructions of Claire Bowern. The list of 386 words was recorded in Sorell, Tasmania in the 19th century by one Charles Sterling. The language was presumably spoken somewhere in the northeast of Tasmania, but the original location of the speakers was not recorded.

References

Northeastern Tasmanian languages